James Hall  was a professional baseball player who played second base for the Brooklyn Atlantics (1872, 1874) of the NAPBBP.

External links

1886 deaths
19th-century baseball players
Brooklyn Atlantics players
Year of birth missing
19th-century deaths from tuberculosis
Tuberculosis deaths in New York (state)